Leonel Marshall Steward Sr.  (born July 31, 1954) is a Cuban former volleyball player who competed in the 1976 Summer Olympics and in the 1980 Summer Olympics.

In 1976 he was part of the Cuban team which won the bronze medal in the Olympic tournament. He played all six matches.

Four years later he finished seventh with the Cuban team in the 1980 Olympic tournament. He played all six matches again.

His son, also a professional volleyball player and also named Leonel Marshall Jr., is well known for his outstanding vertical jump.

Notes

References

External links
 
 
 

1954 births
Living people
Cuban men's volleyball players
Olympic volleyball players of Cuba
Volleyball players at the 1976 Summer Olympics
Volleyball players at the 1980 Summer Olympics
Olympic bronze medalists for Cuba
Olympic medalists in volleyball
Medalists at the 1976 Summer Olympics
Volleyball players at the 1975 Pan American Games
Medalists at the 1975 Pan American Games
Pan American Games gold medalists for Cuba
Pan American Games medalists in volleyball